Peshawar Zoo is one of the largest zoos in Pakistan and the first ever zoo in Peshawar. It opened on 12 February 2018. It is managed by the Forests, Environment and Wildlife department of the Government of Khyber Pakhtunkhwa.

History 
Peshawar zoo's construction formally started on February 3, 2016, with the ground breaking ceremony being attended by Imran Khan and Chief Minister of KPK, Pervez Khattak. The zoo was officially opened to the public on February 13, 2018. The zoo is spread over an area of 29 acres besides the premises of the Pakistan Forest Institute. It is located next to Markaz-Ul-Uloom Islamia Rahatabad.

Some of the first animals to arrive were brought from Lahore Zoo in October 2017, these included a pair of lions and various species of ungulates including nilgai and blackbucks. Other animals were brought from various institutions across Khyber Pukhtunkhwa, including leopards brought from Dhodial pheasantry and a wildlife park in Malakand and an Asiatic black bear from Nathiagali.

The zoo was formally inaugurated and opened to the public on 12 February 2018. Earlier on following the zoo's opening various animals died due to lack of medical facilities and rising temperatures in the city, these included a female snow leopard named Sonhi which died due to a clogged artery which could not be diagnosed on time and at least 2 leopard cubs which died due to heat related causes.

In June 2018, 3 pairs of Bengal tigers arrived at the zoo from South Africa, followed shortly by the arrival of giraffes and the opening of the snake house.

In November 2018 a herd of Arabian oryx arrived from UAE, making this the first endangered species of ungulate to be imported by the zoo.

Areas and attractions

Lion House 
Consisting of indoor housing, with viewing for guests, and a moated enclosure. The zoo is currently home to a pair of lions donated by the Lahore Zoo. Located adjacent is the Bear House, divided into two moats and two indoor sections for Asiatic black bear and Himalayan brown bear. Currently the zoo only house two Asiatic black bears.

Bird Aviary 
A walk through aviary located in the middle of the zoo. This exhibit is not yet complete, with visitors only being able to see it from the outside . Species housed here include great white pelicans, greater flamingos, muscovy ducks, ring-necked pheasants, chukar partridges, Asian houbara bustards, demoiselle cranes and black-crowned cranes among others.

Leopard House 
Consisting of 4 roofed enclosure with indoor shelters for the animals. Species housed here include an Indian leopard, rhesus macaques, a grey wolf and Bengal tigers.

Others 
Other notable animals present at the zoo include giraffes, blackbucks, markhors, grey gorals, black bears, Javan green peafowl, Himalayan griffon vultures, Peregrine falcons and Indian cobras.

Animals

Mammals

Birds

Reptiles

Animal births 
The zoo welcomed 4 Indian leopard cubs on 30, April, 2018. The cubs were born to a pair of leopards originating from the Hazara and Malakand regions of Pakistan. It was reported that at least two of the cubs died due to the increasing temperature in the city. Other births at the zoo include a llama and a Bactrian camel.

See also 
 List of zoos in Pakistan
 List of parks and gardens in Pakistan

References

Peshawar
Zoos in Pakistan
Tourist attractions in Peshawar
2017 establishments in Pakistan
Peshawar District